Esta Alice Spalding is an American author, screenwriter and poet who won the Pat Lowther Award in 2000 for Lost August.

Biography
Born in Boston, Massachusetts, to Phillip Spalding and Linda Spalding, she grew up in Hawaii and currently resides in Culver City, California.

In 1997, Spalding relocated to Vancouver, British Columbia, where she worked as an executive story editor and writer on CBC Television's prime-time drama Da Vinci's Inquest.  She also worked as a writer and executive story editor on all three seasons of The Eleventh Hour, a prime-time drama about investigative journalists on CTV. Both series were highly critically acclaimed and repeatedly won Gemini awards for Best Series.

Spalding adapted Barbara Gowdy's novel Falling Angels into a 2003 feature film that was directed by Scott Smith.  The movie premiered at the Toronto International Film Festival and played at Sundance Film Festival, and garnered many awards and nominations, including a Genie nod for Best Writing for Spalding.  That year, she also co-wrote (with Deepa Mehta) the script adaptation of Carol Shields' Republic of Love, which Mehta directed.  Her 2007 original movie of the week, In God's Country, broke records for viewership on CTV.  She and Tassie Cameron co-wrote the script for Would Be Kings, a movie of the week that premiered on CTV in 2008 to great critical acclaim and for which they were nominated for the Gemini award for Best Writing.  She has been a writer and producing consultant on Flashpoint, Rookie Blue, Being Erica, Bomb Girls and Saving Hope, for which she was nominated for a Writers Guild Award and 19-2, for which she was nominated for a Canadian Screenwriting Award. She was a writer and co-producer on FX's The Bridge, and a writer and supervising producer on CBS' Battle Creek before moving on to Showtime's Masters of Sex as a writer and co-executive producer.

Currently, Spalding is the showrunner on Showtime's On Becoming a God in Central Florida, and a writer and executive producer on Freeform's Party of Five. Her feature film The Last Letter from Your Lover (co-written with Nick Payne) based on the novel by Jojo Moyes will premiere on Netflix in July 2021. She recently published a children's book series that includes Look Out for the Fitzgerald-Trouts, Knock About with the Fitzgerald-Trouts, and Shout Out for the Fitzgerald-Trouts.

Spalding and her mother Linda Spalding co-wrote a novel, Mere, which was published in 2001.

She is a contributing editor to the literary magazine Brick.

She has a B.A from the University of Chicago and an M.A. from Stanford University.

Bibliography
 Shout Out for the Fitzgerald-Trouts - 2019 
 Knock About with the Fitzgerald-Trouts - 2017 
 Look Out for the Fitzgerald-Trouts - 2016 
 The Wife's Account - 2004 
 Carrying Place - 1995
 Anchoress - 1997 
 Lost August - 1999
 Lost Classics - 2000  (edited with Michael Redhill, Michael Ondaatje and Linda Spalding)
 Mere - 2001

References

External links
 

1966 births
Living people
20th-century Canadian poets
21st-century Canadian poets
Writers from Boston
Canadian women poets
20th-century Canadian screenwriters
American expatriate writers in Canada
Writers from Toronto
Writers from Vancouver
American women screenwriters
Canadian television writers
American women television writers
20th-century Canadian women writers
21st-century Canadian women writers
Canadian women screenwriters
Screenwriters from Massachusetts
American television writers
Canadian women television writers
21st-century Canadian screenwriters